Shane Bemis (born c. 1972) is an American politician who is the former mayor of Gresham, Oregon, Oregon's fourth-largest city. He was elected mayor in 2006, at the age of 34, becoming the youngest mayor in Gresham's history.  Prior to serving as mayor, Bemis served as a city councilor for Gresham for one term between 2003 and 2007.

Early life
Shane Bemis was born in Billings, Montana, into a politically active family and ultimately chose to become politically. Raised in Billings, Bemis moved to Gresham when he was fifteen years old. After graduating high school, Bemis attended Marylhurst University, where he earned a bachelor's degree in communications. In his twenties, Bemis opened a Bellagio's Pizzeria franchise in Gresham. He credits his business pursuits with his belief in bringing a "business-oriented" approach to local governance in Gresham.

Political career
In 2002, Bemis ran for councilor in position #6 against John W. Dillow and won the election by a nearly two-to-one margin. After serving one term, Bemis ran for mayor in 2006 and was elected mayor over incumbent Charles Becker by a margin of 7,417 votes for Bemis to 5,208 for Becker.

In 2007 Mayor Bemis pushed TriMet, the local transit agency, to tackle crime along the MAX light-rail line.  This effort resulted in the creation of a transit-police precinct in Gresham.

Bemis was named by the Portland Business Journal as one of the region's "Forty Under 40 Award" recipients in 2007. The "Forty Under 40 Award" honors 40 people in the region under the age of 40 who have shown great accomplishments in their professional lives and made outstanding contributions to their communities. Bemis is a prominent local business person in Gresham, where he is a restaurateur.

Bemis was mentioned as a potential Republican candidate for the 2016 Oregon special gubernatorial election, but ultimately declined to run.

Bemis announced his retirement June 16, 2020, citing the need to spend time with his family and keep his restaurant business viable during the COVID-19 pandemic.

References

External links 
 An opinion piece on Shane Bemis from The Oregonian
 
 
 
  Bemis markets Gresham to solar industry
  Mayor Bemis calls for volunteers
  Gresham hosts green economic summit
 

Living people
1972 births
21st-century American politicians
Mayors of places in Oregon
People from Gresham, Oregon
Oregon city council members
Oregon Republicans